Évangéline, New Brunswick may refer to:
 Evangéline, a local service district in Inkerman Parish, New Brunswick
 Evangeline, Westmorland County, New Brunswick, a community in Greater Moncton, Westmorland County